Gibberula navratilovae is a species of sea snail, a marine gastropod mollusk, in the family Cystiscidae. It is named after American tennis player Martina Navratilova.

Description
The length of the shell attains 1.7 mm.

Distribution
This marine species occurs off Guadeloupe.

References

navratilovae
Gastropods described in 2015
Martina Navratilova